Andrew Freeman may refer to:
Andrew Freeman (inventor) (1909–1996) American electrical engineer and the inventor of the electric block heater for automobiles
Andrew Freeman (musician), American singer

See also
Andrew Freedman, owner of the New York Giants, 1895–1902
Andrew Friedman (disambiguation)